Marlene Jahl is an Austrian taekwondo practitioner. She won one of the bronze medals in the women's heavyweight event at the 2022 World Taekwondo Championships held in Guadalajara, Mexico. She also won one of the bronze medals in her event at the 2021 European Taekwondo Championships held in Sofia, Bulgaria.

References

External links 
 

Living people
Year of birth missing (living people)
Place of birth missing (living people)
Austrian female taekwondo practitioners
World Taekwondo Championships medalists
European Taekwondo Championships medalists
21st-century Austrian women